Lepiku (Estonian for "Alder Grove") is a subdistrict in the district of Pirita, Tallinn, the capital of Estonia. It has a population of 1,523.

See also
Pärnamäe Cemetery
Metsakalmistu
Tallinn TV Tower
Kloostrimets
Tallinn Botanic Garden

References

Subdistricts of Tallinn